Guangyuan is a prefecture-level city in Sichuan Province, China, bordering the provinces of Shaanxi to the northeast and Gansu to the northwest. The city has a population of 2,305,657 as of the 2020 census.

Located roughly between the provincial capitals Chengdu, Lanzhou, Xi'an and Chongqing municipality, it is considered the northern gateway to Sichuan. It is an ancient city, notable for its relics and tombs.

History
Formerly known as Lizhou (or Li prefecture), Guangyuan was the birthplace of Wu Zetian, the only woman in Chinese history to bear the title Empress Regent.

On May 12, 2008 a magnitude 7.9 earthquake occurred. 4,822 people were killed, 28,245 injured, and 125 missing in the city as of June 7, 2008.

Economy
Guangyuan's economy is based on a diverse array of heavy industry, as well as mining and agriculture. Plant 821, a former large plutonium producing reactor, now used to process nuclear waste, is located near Guangyuan. The city is an important production center for traditional Chinese medicine.

Administrative divisions

Climate

Transport 
Located roughly between the provincial capitals Chengdu, Chongqing, Lanzhou, Xi'an, Guangyuan is an important traffic hub in northern Sichuan. The city has a port on the Jialing River, which is the closest inland port to Northwest China, and navigable all the way the east coast.

China National Highway 212
G5 Beijing–Kunming Expressway
G5012 Enguang Expressway
G75 Lanzhou–Haikou Expressway
Baoji–Chengdu railway (part of the main route from Chengdu to Xi'an and Beijing)
Xi'an–Chengdu high-speed railway (completed in December 2017)
Lanzhou–Chongqing high-speed railway
Guangyuan Panlong Airport

Cuisine 
Guangyuan is known for Wangcang noodles.

References

External links
Official website of Guangyuan Government

 
Cities in Sichuan
Prefecture-level divisions of Sichuan